Everybody Loves the Sunshine is a studio album by Roy Ayers released under the Roy Ayers Ubiquity umbrella. It was released through Polydor Records in 1976. It peaked at number 51 on the Billboard 200 chart. In 2016, Pitchfork placed the title track at number 72 on the "200 Best Songs of the 1970s" list. The song appears in the video game Grand Theft Auto: Vice City Stories  in the fictional radio station VCFL.

The song "Everybody Loves the Sunshine" is notable for its drone synth note through most of the cut. It has been covered by artists including D'Angelo, Takuya Kuroda, the Robert Glasper Experiment, and others.

Track listing

Personnel
Credits adapted from liner notes.
Roy Ayers Ubiquity
 Roy Ayers – vibraphone, lead vocals, electric piano, synthesizer (ARP, String Ensemble), percussion, backing vocals
 Philip Woo – piano, electric piano, synthesizer (ARP, String Ensemble)
 Chano O'Ferral – congas, percussion, lead vocals
 Ronald "Head" Drayton – guitar
 John "Shaun" Solomon – electric bass
 Doug Rhodes – drums
 Chicas (Debbie Darby) – lead vocals, backing vocals
Technical
Leonid Lubianitsky - front cover photography

"Special thanks extended to the following: Calvin Brown, Greg Phillinganes, William Allen, Byron Miller, Ricky Lawson, Dennis Davis, Justo Almario, Lew Soloff, Diana Hayes, Edna Holt, Wayne Garfield."

Charts

References

External links
 

1976 albums
Roy Ayers albums
Polydor Records albums